The Bessemer Gold Medal is awarded annually by the Institute of Materials, Minerals and Mining (IOM3) "for outstanding services to the steel industry, to the inventor or designer of any significant innovation in the process employed in the manufacture of steel, or for innovation in the use of steel in the manufacturing industry or the economy generally". The recipient is expected to prepare and deliver the Bessemer Lecture.

It was established and endowed to the Iron and Steel Institute in 1874 by Sir Henry Bessemer and was first awarded to Isaac Lowthian Bell in 1874. The Iron and Steel Institute merged in 1974 into the Institute of Metals, which in 1993 became part of the Institute of Materials, which in turn became part of the IOM3 in 2002.

Prizewinners
Source: IOM3 archive website and current IOM3 website

IOM3

2020 David Anthony Worsley 
2019 J Bolton
2018 I Samarasekera
2017 J Speer
2016 A W Cramb
2015 John Beynon
2014 H Tomono
2013 Prince Philip, Duke of Edinburgh
2013 K Mills
2012 G Honeyman
2011 I Christmas
2010 M Sellars
2009 G Arvedi
2008 T Mukherjee
2007 L Mittal
2006 H Bhadeshia
2005 S I Pettifor
2004 R J Fruehan
2003 J P Birat
2002 R E Dolby

Institute of Materials

2001 M J Pettifor
2000 Terry Gladman
1999 Etham T Turkdogan
1998 R Baker
1997 F Kenneth Iverson
1996 Sir Brian Moffat
1995 P Wright
1994 F B Pickering
1993 H Saito

Institute of Metals

1992 C E H Morris
1991 Frank Fitzgerald
1990 J S Pennington
1989 Gerald R Heffernan
1988 Sir R Scholey
1987 Tae-Joon Park
1986 J.R.D. Tata
1985 Viscount E Davignon

Metals Society

1984 P Metz
1983 I K MacGregor
1982 G W van Stein Callenfels
1981 Sir I McLennan
1980 M Tenenbaum
1979 H O H Haavisto
1978 Karl Brotzmann
1977 H Morrogh
1976 J D Joy
1975 Richard Weck
1974 Sir M Finniston

Iron and Steel Institute

1973 J W Menter
1972 M Morgan
1971 A G Quarrell
1970 P Coheur
1969 Queen Elizabeth II
1968 F D Richardson
1967 E T Judge
1966 John Hugh Chesters
1965 T Sendzimir
1965 N P Allen
1964 H Malcor
1963 F H Saniter
1962 Sir Charles Goodeve
1961 W Barr
1960 Hermann Schenck
1959 B M S Kalling
1958 W F Cartwright
1957 R Durrer
1956 C Sykes
1955 J Chipman
1954 T P Colclough
1953 R Mather
1952 H H Burton
1951 B F Fairless
1950 J Mitchell
1948 W J Dawson
1947 K M Tigerchiold
1947 Sir William J Larke
1946 J S Hollings
1945 Harold Wright
1944 E Lewis
1943 J H Whiteley
1942 E G Grace
1941 T Swinden
1940 Sir Andrew McCance
1939 J Henderson
1938 C H Desch
1937 Colonel N. T. Belaiew
1937 A Mayer
1936 F Clements
1935 A M Portevin
1934 King George V
1933 W H Hatfield
1932 H Louis
1931 Sir Harold Carpenter
1930 W Rosenhain
1930 E Schneider
1929 Sir Charles A Parsons
1928 C M Schwab
1927 Axel Wahlberg
1926 Sir Hugh Bel
1925 T Turner
1924 A Sauveur
1923 W H Maw
1922 K Honda
1921 C Freemont
1920 H Brearley
1919 Federico Giolitti
1918 The Rt Hon Lord Invernairn of Strathnairn
1917 A Lamberton
1916 F W Harbord
1915 P Martin
1914 Edward Riley
1913 A Greiner
1912 J H Darby
1911 H L Le Chatelier
1910 E H Saniter
1909 A Pourcel
1908 B Talbot
1907 J A Brinell
1906 F Osmond
1906 King Edward VII
1905 J O Arnold
1904 A Carnegie
1904 Sir R Hadfield
1903 The Rt Hon Lord Airedale of Gledhow
1902 F A Krupp
1901 J E Stead
1900 Henri de Wendel
1899 H M Queen Victoria
1898 R Prince-Williams
1897 Sir Frederick Abel
1896 H Wedding
1895 H M Howe
1894 John Gjers
1893 J Fritz
1892 A Cooper
1891 The Rt Hon Lord Armstrong
1890 W D Allen
1890 Hon A S Hewitt
1889 J D Ellis
1889 H Schneider
1888 D Adamson
1887 James Riley
1886 Edward Williams
1885 R Akerman
1884 E P Martin
1884 E W Richards
1883 G J Snelus
1883 Sidney Gilchrist Thomas
1882 A L Holley
1881 W Menelaus
1880 Sir J Whitworth
1879 P Cooper
1878 P R von Tunner
1877 J Percy
1876 R F Mushet
1875 Sir C W Siemens
1874 Sir Lowthian Bell

See also
 List of engineering awards

References

Chemical engineering awards
Awards established in 1874
Bessemer Gold Medal
British awards
Steel industry of the United Kingdom